Sandra Viviana Galvis Gómez (born 28 June 1986) is a Colombian race walker. She competed in the women's 20 kilometres walk event at the 2016 Summer Olympics.

She represented Colombia at the 2020 Summer Olympics in the women's 20 kilometres walk event.

References

External links
 

1986 births
Living people
Colombian female racewalkers
Olympic athletes of Colombia
Athletes (track and field) at the 2016 Summer Olympics
Athletes (track and field) at the 2020 Summer Olympics
Athletes (track and field) at the 2018 South American Games
South American Games silver medalists for Colombia
South American Games medalists in athletics
Central American and Caribbean Games gold medalists for Colombia
Competitors at the 2010 Central American and Caribbean Games
People from Cundinamarca Department
Athletes (track and field) at the 2019 Pan American Games
Pan American Games competitors for Colombia
Central American and Caribbean Games medalists in athletics
21st-century Colombian women